The Spirit of Boise Balloon Classic is an annual, five-day festival held at Ann Morrison Park in Boise, Idaho, USA, featuring hot air balloons. Prior to the balloon classic, an annual balloon event had occurred in Boise since 1974.

History
The Spirit of Boise Balloon Classic was organized by balloonist Scott Spencer and began in 1991, featuring ten balloons. The balloon classic was part of the Boise River Festival, and both events occurred together until 2002 when the Boise River Festival was discontinued. The balloon classic was cancelled 2007–2009 but returned in 2010 with balloon rides, free live music, and a variety of food vendors.

The  Spirit of Boise hot air balloon was designed by Boise school children in 1999 and was constructed with grant monies from the Boise 2000 Lasting Legacy Committee.

In 2016 the Spirit of Boise Balloon Classic inspired emerging artist Betsie Richardson to paint a Boise traffic control box. The work, titled Lift off at the Spirit of Boise Balloon Classic, has been featured by the Boise City Department of Arts and History.

The fourth cancellation happened in 2020. The 27th was deferred to 2021.

2018
The 2018 balloon classic was held in Ann Morrison Park August 29 through September 2 and featured over 40 hot air balloons.

See also
Hot air ballooningHot air balloon festival

References

External links

 Spirit of Boise website
 Hot Air Balloon website
 The Spokesman-Review:Spirit of Boise Balloon Classic Archive

Hot air balloon festivals in the United States
Festivals in Idaho
Culture of Boise, Idaho